The St. Paul sandwich can be found in many Chinese American restaurants in St. Louis, Missouri, as well as other cities in Missouri, including Columbia, Jefferson City, and Springfield. The sandwich consists of an egg foo young patty (made with mung bean sprouts and minced white onions) served with dill pickle slices, white onion, mayonnaise, and lettuce between two slices of white bread. The St. Paul sandwich also comes in different combinations and specials, such as chicken, pork, shrimp, beef, and other varieties.

Origin
One source has the origin of the St. Paul sandwich dating to the early 1940s, when Chinese restaurants created the sandwich as a unique dish that was in a more familiar sandwich form that would appeal to the palates of Midwestern Americans, an early example of fusion cuisine. According to local legend, the St. Paul sandwich was invented by Steven Yuen at Park Chop Suey in Lafayette Square, a neighborhood near downtown St. Louis; Yuen named the sandwich after his hometown of St. Paul, Minnesota.

Food writers James Beard and Evan Jones believed that the Denver or Western sandwich was created by "the many Chinese chefs who cooked for logging camps and railroad gangs in the nineteenth and early twentieth centuries" and was probably derived from egg foo young. They believed that the early Denver sandwiches were actually St. Paul sandwiches.

This sandwich was featured in the PBS documentary Sandwiches That You Will Like in 2003 and featured in a book by artist Kelly Pratt released in 2016 called Stately Sandwiches as the sandwich chosen to represent the state of Missouri.

Availability
It is usually only available in Chinese restaurants in the St. Louis metropolitan area as well as a select few Chinese American restaurants in outlying regions of Missouri, the owners of which are typically originally from St. Louis.

See also

 St. Louis cuisine
 Chow mein sandwich
 Bánh mì
 Roti john
 Denver sandwich
 List of American sandwiches
 List of regional dishes of the United States
 List of sandwiches
 List of egg dishes

References

External links
Article on the St. Paul sandwich by Thomas Crone
"St. Louie Chop Suey," St. Louis Riverfront Times, Nov 15, 2006

American Chinese cuisine
American sandwiches
Asian-American culture in Missouri
Chinese fusion cuisine
Cuisine of St. Louis
Cuisine of the Midwestern United States
Egg sandwiches